The 2020–21 Serie A1 is the 76th season of the highest professional Italian Women's Volleyball League. The season takes place from September to April and is contested by thirteen teams.

Format
The regular season consists of 26 rounds, where the thirteen participating teams play each other twice (once home and once away). At the completion of the regular season, the twelve best teams advance to the playoffs and the team finishing in 13th is relegated to Serie A2.

The standings criteria are:
highest number of result points (points awarded for results: 3 points for 3–0 or 3–1 wins, 2 points for 3–2 win, 1 point for 2–3 loss);
highest number of matches won;
highest set quotient (the number of total sets won divided by the number of total sets lost);
highest points quotient (the number of total points scored divided by the number of total points conceded).

Teams

Regular season

League table

Results table

Fixtures and results
 All times are local, CEST (UTC+02:00) between 19 September and 24 October 2020 and CET (UTC+01:00) from 25 October.

Round 1

Round 2

Round 3

Round 4

Round 5

Round 6

Round 7

Round 8

Round 9

Round 10

Round 11

Round 12

Round 13

Round 14

Round 15

Round 16

Round 17

Round 18

Round 19

Round 20

Round 21

Round 22

Round 23

Round 24

Round 25

Round 26

Playoffs

Bracket

Round of 16

(8) Delta Despar Trentino vs. (9) Il Bisonte Firenze

Il Bisonte Firenze wins series, 2–0.

(5) Savino Del Bene Scandicci vs. (12) Zanetti Bergamo

Savino Del Bene Scandicci wins series, 2–0.

7) Bosca S.Bernardo Cuneo vs. (10) Bartoccini Fortinfissi Perugia

Bartoccini Fortinfissi Perugia wins series, 2–0.(6) Reale Mutua Fenera Chieri vs. (11) Vbc Èpiù CasalmaggioreReale Mutua Fenera Chieri wins series, 2–0.Quarterfinals

(1) Imoco Volley Conegliano vs. (9) Il Bisonte FirenzeImoco Volley Conegliano wins series, 2–0.(4) Unet E-Work Busto Arsizio vs. (5) Savino Del Bene ScandicciSavino Del Bene Scandicci wins series, 2–0.(2) Igor Gorgonzola Novara vs. (10) Bartoccini Fortinfissi PerugiaIgor Gorgonzola Novara wins series, 2–0.(3) Saugella Monza vs. (6) Reale Mutua Fenera ChieriSaugella Monza wins series, 2–1.Semifinals

(1) Imoco Volley Conegliano vs. (5) Savino Del Bene ScandicciImoco Volley Conegliano wins series, 2–0.(2) Igor Gorgonzola Novara vs. (3) Saugella MonzaIgor Gorgonzola Novara wins series, 2–0.Finals

(1) Imoco Volley Conegliano vs. (2) Igor Gorgonzola NovaraImoco Volley Conegliano wins series, 2–0.''

Final standings

References

External links

https://women.volleybox.net/women-italian-serie-a1-2020-21-o11555/matches

2020–21
Italy, women
Italy Serie A1
Italy Serie A1
Volleyball
Volleyball